While Sikh theology and code of conduct is not supposed to approve of superstitions, in practice some times some Sikhs have been observed to persist with some superstitious practices, including even some of those followed with influence of other communities.

For example sneezing before important event is considered inauspicious, and certain days of the week are considered taboo for washing of the hair. Newlyweds are welcomed by an oil pouring ritual. Sightings of a bird called 'Baaj' (variously translated as hawk/falcon/eagle) are considered auspicious.  One of the points of the Sikh Rehat Maryada states that a single soul or entity existed in ten Gurus. Aartis are performed on certain occasions at certain places while rehat maryada does not prescribe the same. A substantial amount of milk is used to wash floor of the Golden Temple. The Sikh diaspora is seen to compromise or oppose safety and security measures of various institutions of countries to maintain their hair-related practices.

Instances of superstition from Sikh history 

Ranjit Singh  (13 November 1780 – 27 June 1839) was most prominent leader of Sikh empire  was also known for following various superstitious practices. Ranjit Singh took important decisions relating his expeditions by religiously consulting the  holy  scripture .  In 1805  he took even difficult political decision of rejecting  Raja Jaswant  Singh  Holkar  of  Bharatpur and decided to support  British  by  randomly  putting two  slips  of  papers  in  the  Granth and extracting one that indicated an alliance with the British. While Sikh scholar criticized Ranjit Singh for his superstitious beliefs akin to Hinduism, analysis of Harjot Oberoi says that in 18 and 19 th century the superstitions observed by Ranjeet Singh including worshiping multiple deities were common practice without any social stigma among then Sikh communities.

See also 
 Ardās
 Bhog#In Sikhism
 Cult of personality
 Gurmata
 Singh sabha
 Superstitions in India 
 Superstitions in Muslim societies
 Prohibitions in Sikhism

References 

Superstitions 
Sikh beliefs
Sikh practices